August Sabac el Cher was an early Afro-German who had at least one descendant in 21st century Germany. August, though not yet named that, was given to Prince Albert of Prussia as a boy in 1843 when the Prince was in Egypt. August grew to be embraced as a Prussian and married a white woman. His son Gustav became a respected soldier and an imperial bandmaster.

References 

German people of Sudanese descent
Servants
German domestic workers